Amq, AMQ or amq may refer to:

 Amahai language (ISO 639: 1mq), spoken in Indonesia
 Approximate member query; see Quotient filter
 Pattimura Airport (IATA: AMQ), Indonesia
 An alternative spelling for Amqu, a region in Lebanon
 AM Quarterly, the official magazine of the Aston Martin Owners Club
 A software product from Red Hat

See also
 Advanced Message Queuing Protocol (AMQP)